The 1979 Maryland Terrapins football team represented the University of Maryland in the 1979 NCAA Division I-A football season. In their eighth season under head coach Jerry Claiborne, the Terrapins compiled a 7–4 record (4–2 in conference), finished in a tie for second place in the Atlantic Coast Conference, and outscored their opponents 198 to 135. The team's statistical leaders included Mike Tice with 897 passing yards, Charlie Wysocki with 1,140 rushing yards, and Joe Carinci with 375 receiving yards.

Schedule

Roster

References

Maryland
Maryland Terrapins football seasons
Maryland Terrapins football